A by-election was held for the New South Wales Legislative Assembly electorate of Mudgee on 8 September 1873 because Joseph Innes was appointed to the Legislative Council.

Dates

Candidates
Walter Church was the former member for Goldfields West who had been defeated at the 1872 election.
Alfred O'Connor was a gold miner who was previously a member of the Parliament of Victoria from 1861–1864.
Joseph O'Connor was a printer and journalist from Sydney who had unsuccessfully stood at the December 1870 West Sydney by-election, and the 1872 Mudgee by-election.
John Scully was a gold miner.

Results

Joseph Innes was appointed to the Legislative Council.

See also
Electoral results for the district of Mudgee
List of New South Wales state by-elections

References

1873 elections in Australia
New South Wales state by-elections
1870s in New South Wales